Veronika Dytrtová (born 18 June 1980) is a Czech former competitive figure skater. She is the 1998 Nebelhorn Trophy bronze medalist and a four-time Czech national medalist. In the first half of her career, she competed for Germany under the surname "Dytrt", winning the bronze medal at the 1997 German Championships. Her best ISU Championship results were 14th at the 1997 World Junior Championships and 17th at the 1997 European Championships. She began competing for the Czech Republic in the 1998–99 season. She is the sister of Anette Dytrt.

Her coaches included Steffi Ruttkies, Karin Gaiser, and Vlasta Kopřivová.

Programs

Competitive highlights 
GP: Champions Series / Grand Prix

References

External links 
 Veronia Dytrtova at the International Skating Union
 Veronia Dytrtova at Tracings.net

Czech female single skaters
German people of Czech descent
1980 births
Living people
Figure skaters from Prague